Pavel Markaw (born 4 December 1991) is a Belarusian footballer, who plays currently for Dnepr Mogilev.

References

External links
 
 
 Profile at Pressball.by

1991 births
Living people
People from Mogilev
Sportspeople from Mogilev Region
Belarusian footballers
Association football midfielders
FC Dnepr Mogilev players
FC Polotsk players
FC Lokomotiv Gomel players
FC Granit Mikashevichi players